Zacuscă is a vegetable spread popular in Romania and Moldova. Similar spreads are found in other countries  in the Balkan region, and bordering regions.

Ingredients
The main ingredients are roasted eggplant, sauteed onions, tomato paste, and roasted "Round of Hungary" or "Paprika Pepper" pepper (Romanian pepper called gogoșari).  Some add mushrooms, carrots, or celery. Bay leaves are added as spice, as well as other ingredients (oil, salt, and pepper). Traditionally, a family will cook a large quantity of it after the fall harvest and preserve it through canning.

Use
Zacuscă can be eaten as a relish or spread, typically on bread. It is said to improve in taste after some months of maturing but must be used within days of opening. Although traditionally prepared at home, it is also commercially available. Some Bulgarian and Middle Eastern brands are available in the United States. In the Orthodox Christian majority countries, it is sometimes eaten during fasting seasons due to the absence of meat, eggs or dairy products.

Etymology
The word zacuscă is of Slavic origin which means simply "appetizer", "breakfast" or "snack" (see zakuska)

See also
 Ajvar, pindjur and ljutenica, similar spreads in Balkan cuisine
 Kyopolou, a similar Bulgarian dish
 Biber salçası, a Turkish paste made from red peppers alone
 List of eggplant dishes
 List of spreads

References

External links
 Zacusca (recipe)

Condiments
Romanian appetizers
Moldovan dishes
Eggplant dishes
Spreads (food)